L.A. Street Racing is a racing video game developed by Invictus Games and published by Groove Games exclusively for Microsoft Windows. It was released on 1 December 2006 in Europe and on 28 May 2007 in North America. The game was re-released in June 2008 by City Interactive under the title Overspeed: High Performance Street Racing, as a low-price (budget) game.

Plot
Matt Peacock is the best race driver in the underground of L.A. and the player wants to take that title away from him. But of course the best of the best does not race a newcomer so the players has got to race their way up starting from place 61.

Gameplay

At the beginning of the game the player choose one of two available cars, before waiting at the "COOL-Market" for contestants to arrive. Once someone willing to race comes by, the player is given a choice of tuning parts from their opponent that the player can race for. Before every race the player is required to bet at least one of their own items, and since the player cannot save the game manually, losing a part means that the player has got to earn it again. 

Every part of the player's car (engine, nitro, etc.) can be enhanced in several stages and once the player has collected all parts of the same stage, the player can do a "pinkslip race", in which the opponent bets his car. Losing that race will cost every single tuning part the player has collected for the player's car. The parts the player wins are limited to the car they win them with, so the player cannot swap them between cars. If the player put parts of different stages on their car, the handling will decrease, so the player needs to decide if it is wise to get the power of the tier 3 engine, if this makes the handling of the car much worse. 

The ranking list is divided into four prestige levels, with every level having its own starting location.  For instance, if the player go to the Village Motel, the player needs prestige level 4 to race or otherwise they will send the player away. The same thing happens when the player is level 2 and the player wait at the COOL-Market because the player is too powerful for them.

The races themselves take place on marked-off streets in Los Angeles at night. The cars handle more realistically than the ones in Need for Speed: Carbon, which means that the player cannot "fly" through curves by taking the foot from the acceleration for a second. The player needs to consider, for instance, that the back drifts into the scenery if the player takes the curve too steep. If certain parts of the race track are driven without a mistake, a small nitro refill is granted. 

L.A. Street Racing features an online mode where players can drive against up to seven other opponents.

Reception
IGN gave the game a score of 6.5 out of 10, stating, "The framework for a very cool racing game is here, and certainly the driving physics are superb. Yet so much of it seems incomplete or untested. The AI needs polishing, and the upgrade system is promising yet flawed. Still, at its reduced price point, LA Street Racing is an interesting, thrilling option."

References

External links
 

2006 video games
Racing video games
Street racing video games
Video games developed in Hungary
Video games set in Los Angeles
Windows games
Windows-only games
CI Games games
Multiplayer and single-player video games
Groove Games games